This article presents the filmography of Mexican actor Ernesto Alonso.

Films

Television

Other works

References 

Male actor filmographies
Director filmographies
Mexican filmographies